The 2020–21 Regionalliga was the 13th season of the Regionalliga, the ninth under the new format, as the fourth tier of the German football league system.

Format
A new promotion format was decided on in 2019. From this season onward, the Regionalliga Südwest and West receive a fixed promotion spot. A third promotion spot rotates between the other three divisions, with the remaining two champions participating in play-offs for a fourth spot. A draw has determined that the Regionalliga Nordost receives the third direct promotion spot this season.

Regionalliga Nord
22 teams from the states of Bremen, Hamburg, Lower Saxony and Schleswig-Holstein competed in the ninth season of the reformed Regionalliga Nord. VfV Hildesheim and Atlas Delmenhorst were promoted from the 2019–20 Oberliga Niedersachsen, Teutonia Ottensen was promoted from the 2019–20 Oberliga Hamburg, FC Oberneuland was promoted from the 2019–20 Bremen-Liga and Phönix Lübeck was promoted from the 2019–20 Schleswig-Holstein-Liga.

As the league expanded during the COVID-19 pandemic, the league was split into two regional groups. The five best teams from each group were supposed to qualify for a championship round, with the other teams qualifying for a relegation round. The relegation rules were not announced.

On 8 April 2021, the clubs voted to abandon the season due to the COVID-19 pandemic in Germany and declare the third-best team by points per game, TSV Havelse, participants in the promotion play-offs, since Weiche Flensburg and Werder Bremen II did not apply for a 3. Liga license. No teams are supposed to be promoted to or relegated from the Regionalliga. The abandonment was confirmed by the Northern German Football Association (NFV) presidium on 20 April 2021. No teams were relegated to or promoted from the Oberliga. On 18 May 2021, the NFV presidium announced that it has made an official decision on who would participate in the promotion play-offs. First, the top teams of each group that applied for a 3. Liga license, Teutonia Ottensen and TSV Havelse, were determined. Then, with involvement from the two clubs, the NFV presidium decided to nominate TSV Havelse for the promotion play-offs.

Nord

Top scorers

Süd

Top scorers

Regionalliga Nordost
20 teams from the states of Berlin, Brandenburg, Mecklenburg-Vorpommern, Saxony, Saxony-Anhalt and Thuringia competed in the eighth season of the reformed Regionalliga Nordost. Chemnitzer FC and Carl Zeiss Jena were relegated from the 2019–20 3. Liga. Tennis Borussia Berlin was promoted from the 2019–20 NOFV-Oberliga Nord and FSV Luckenwalde was promoted from the 2019–20 NOFV-Oberliga Süd.

On 24 March 2021, the clubs unanimously voted to abandon the season due to the COVID-19 pandemic in Germany and declare Viktoria Berlin champions. This decision was confirmed by the Northeastern German Football Association presidium on 16 April 2021, which also decided that one team would be relegated and the league size limited to 22 teams for the next season, which meant that a second team would have been relegated had three teams been relegated to the Regionalliga Nordost.

Top goalscorers

Regionalliga West
21 teams from North Rhine-Westphalia competed in the Regionalliga West. Preußen Münster was relegated from the 2019–20 3. Liga. FC Wegberg-Beeck was promoted from the 2019–20 Mittelrheinliga, SV Straelen was promoted from the 2019–20 Oberliga Niederrhein and SC Wiedenbrück and Rot Weiss Ahlen were promoted from the 2019–20 Oberliga Westfalen.

Contrary to previous seasons, due to time pressure the Westphalia DFB-Pokal play-off was not be played for the next two seasons. Originally, the winner of the 2020–21 Oberliga Westfalen was supposed to qualify for the 2021–22 DFB-Pokal, while the best-placed Westphalian team from the 2021–22 Regionalliga West was supposed to qualify for the 2022–23 DFB-Pokal. However, due to the COVID-19 pandemic in Germany, the Oberliga Westfalen had to be abandoned and the order was swapped.

Initially, five teams were going to be relegated. However, the Mittelrheinliga, Oberliga Niederrhein and Oberliga Westfalen were all abandoned, with no teams from these leagues being promoted. Therefore, only one team was relegated.

Top goalscorers

Regionalliga Südwest
22 teams from Baden-Württemberg, Hesse, Rhineland-Palatinate and Saarland competed in the eighth season of the Regionalliga Südwest. Sonnenhof Großaspach was relegated from the 2019–20 3. Liga. Schott Mainz was promoted from the 2019–20 Oberliga Rheinland-Pfalz/Saar, VfB Stuttgart II was promoted from the 2019–20 Oberliga Baden-Württemberg and Eintracht Stadtallendorf and Hessen Kassel were promoted from the 2019–20 Hessenliga.

Initially, six teams were going to be relegated. However, the Oberliga Rheinland-Pfalz/Saar, Oberliga Baden-Württemberg and Hessenliga were all abandoned, with no teams from these leagues being promoted. Therefore, only two teams were relegated.

Top goalscorers

Regionalliga Bayern

The Bavarian Football Association cancelled the 2020–21 season, which would have been the ninth for the Regionalliga Bayern, and enrolled Türkgücü München in the 2020–21 3. Liga. The ongoing 2019–20 season had to resume without Türkgücü in September 2020 and conclude in mid-2021.

Championship play-offs

Top scorers

Promotion play-offs
The match dates were announced on 23 April 2021. A draw was held on 8 May 2021 to determine the order of the legs.

|}

All times Central European Summer Time (UTC+2)

TSV Havelse won 2–0 on aggregate.

References

External links
 Regionalliga   DFB.de
 Regionalliga Nord  nordfv.de
 Regionalliga West  wdfv.de
 Regionalliga Bayern  bfv.de

2020-21
4
2020–21 in European fourth tier association football leagues
Germany